Slovenia competed at the 1992 Summer Paralympics in Barcelona, Spain. 8 competitors from Slovenia won 3 medals including 2 gold and 1 bronze and finished 35th in the medal table.

Medalists

See also 
 Slovenia at the Paralympics
 Slovenia at the 1992 Summer Olympics

References 

Nations at the 1992 Summer Paralympics
1992
Summer Paralympics